Plus Therapeutics, Inc. is a clinical-stage pharmaceutical company developing innovative, targeted radiotherapeutics for adults and children with rare and difficult-to-treat cancers.  The company is headquartered in Austin, Texas, United States.

Company history
Plus Therapeutics, Inc. was formerly known as Cytori Therapeutics, Inc.  In 2017, Cytori Therapeutics announced that it had acquired a nanomedicine platform.  In 2019, Cytori Therapeutics announced that it had divested its autologous cell therapy assets to Lorem Vascular of Australia and Seijiro Shirahama of Japan.  In 2019, Cytori Therapeutics announced that it had changed its focus and name to Plus Therapeutics.  In 2020, Plus Therapeutics announced that it had licensed a novel oncology platform, including multiple radiopharmaceutical assets.

Core technology: Rhenium NanoLiposome radiotherapeutics
Plus Therapeutics is developing nanoliposome-encapsulated BMEDA-chelated radioisotope drugs to treat various types of cancer. The company's initial focus is on developing BMEDA-chelated Rhenium-186 NanoLiposome (186RNL) for the treatment of recurrent glioblastoma – a rare, incurable, and fatal disease.

Rhenium-186 (186Re) (half-life 90 hours) is a reactor produced isotope with great potential for medical therapy. It is in the same chemical family as Technetium-99m (99mTc), a radioactive tracer that is the most commonly used isotope for diagnostic scintigraphic imaging in nuclear medicine. Like 99mTc, rhenium is not taken up by bone and is readily cleared by the kidneys.
While 186Re emits therapeutic beta particles, every 10th isotope decay also produces a gamma photon. The average 186Re beta particle path length in tissue of 2 millimeters is ideal for treatment of solid tumors. Additionally, the emitted gamma photons have similar photon energy to those emitted by 99mTc, allowing for imaging of the isotope within the body on standard nuclear imaging equipment available in routine medical practice. Therefore, the 186Re isotope has great potential in Convection Enhanced Delivery (CED) applications of local therapy of solid tumors. However, a carrier is needed to deliver the isotope to the brain and maintain its localization at the desired site, as otherwise it would quickly disperse and be carried away from the site of injection by the circulatory system.

Nanotechnology describes the use of atoms, molecules, or compounds to create extremely small materials and structures, having a size of 100 to 1 nanometers, with special properties that can be applied across many disciplines including electronics, energy, environment, and medicine.  In medicine, these materials and structures are often used for site-specific drug delivery and take the form various organic and inorganic nanoparticles.  Nanoparticle morphology, both size and shape, affects how cells in the body “see” these nanoparticles and ultimately influences their toxicity, distribution, and targeting ability.  Of the various nanotechnology drug delivery systems, NanoLiposomes have been extensively explored and undergone significant technical advances since they were first developed in 1965.  Today, many are regulatory-approved and clinically- and commercially-proven across multiple medical areas including, but not limited to, cancer treatment, fungal infections, and pain management.  NanoLiposomes are small, complex, spontaneously-forming drug carriers consisting of a precise formulation of naturally occurring phospholipids and cholesterol — nearly identical to the lipid membranes of normal human cells. This means that there are natural degradation pathways in the human body for these lipid nanoparticles.  NanoLiposome properties such as size and structure, electrical charge, lipid composition, and surface modification are each critical to the ability of the product to provide reproducible drug delivery required by regulatory authorities and relied upon by physicians and patients.  Although larger liposomes can be manufactured, the most useful size range for drug carrier applications is 80-100 nanometers.  NanoLiposomes of this size have the ability to facilitate retention at the site of injection.

NanoLiposomes in the 100 nanometer size range have been the most investigated carrier for convection-enhanced delivery (CED) of drugs  to the brain.  These studies include the use of CED-delivery of NanoLiposomes carrying chemotherapeutic agents directly to brain tumor, including drugs such as irinotecan and topotecan.  If NanoLiposomes are to be utilized as a carrier for radioisotopes, a method for the efficient loading of NanoLiposomes with the radioisotopes is needed.  Such a method has been developed for the labeling of NanoLiposomes with radiotherapeutic Rhenium radionuclides to very high levels of specific activity.  This novel approach uses a specially developed molecule known as BMEDA-2 to chelate with Rhenium-186 and carry it into the interior of a NanoLiposome where it is irreversibly trapped.

Recurrent Glioblastoma

The purpose of the ReSPECT-GBM Clinical Trial is to assess the safety, tolerability, and distribution of a new medication, Rhenium-186 NanoLiposome (186RNL), in adults with recurrent or progressive malignant glioma after standard surgical, radiation, and/or chemotherapy treatment.  ReSPECT-GBM is supported by the U.S. National Institutes of Health / National Cancer Institute.

According to the most recent CBTRUS Statistical Report, annually there are approximately 12,900 cases of glioblastoma diagnosed, with historical 1 year and 5 year relative survival rates of 40.8% and 6.8%, respectively.  The poor survival is attributable partly to the nature of the tumor.  The infiltrative nature of glioblastoma results in difficulty eliminating microscopic disease despite macroscopic gross-total resection, with 90% of patients having recurrence at the original tumor location. The location of the tumor also makes drug delivery difficult with only small or lipophilic molecules able to cross the blood brain barrier to reach the tumor.  Of those agents that are able to reach the tumor, glioblastomas have shown to be resistant to most cytotoxic agents and to quickly develop resistance when initially sensitive.

Leptomeningeal Metastases

Plus Therapeutics is developing 186RNL (Rhenium-186 NanoLiposome), an innovative, targeted radiotherapeutic for multiple rare and difficult-to-treat cancers.   In the U.S. multi-center ReSPECT-LM Phase 1 clinical trial, 186RNL will be administered through an intraventricular catheter (Ommaya reservoir) in patients with LM.  The treatment consists of a single administered dose of 186RNL per patient on an outpatient basis by the clinical trial physician. The ReSPECT-LM U.S. Phase 1 Clinical Trial is planned to begin in late 2021.

Leptomeningeal metastases (LM) are a rare but typically fatal complication of advanced cancer in which cancer cells spread to the central nervous system (CNS) and are found in either the leptomeninges (membrane surrounding the brain and spinal cord) or cerebrospinal fluid (CSF) (circulates nutrients and chemicals to the brain and spinal cord).  Despite affecting over 110,000 people annually in the U.S., highly effective, approved treatments are not available.

Pediatric Brain Cancer

Plus Therapeutics is developing the 186RNL radiotherapeutic for the treatment of rare, frequently fast-growing pediatric brain and spinal cord tumors with a poor prognosis – diffuse instrinsic pontine glioma (DIPG), ependymoma and high-grade glioma (HGG).  The ReSPECT-PBC (Pediatric Brain Cancer) U.S. Phase 1 Clinical Trial is planned to initiate in 2022.

Cancer is the leading cause of death by disease among children in the U.S.  Brain and spinal cord tumors are the 2nd most common cancers in children, accounting for ~26% of childhood cancers.

DIPG is a rare, fast-growing CNS tumor that forms in glial cells in the pons region of the brain stem; spreads to nearby tissue and other parts of the brain stem, are hard to treat, and have a poor prognosis.

Ependymoma is a rare, slow- or fast-growing (depends on Grade) primary CNS tumor that forms in ependymal cells that line the ventricles of the brain and the center of the spinal cord; may spread throughout the CNS but spread outside of the CNS is rare; all can recur but often patients are tumor-free for years before testing shows new tumor growth, either at the same location as the first tumor or somewhere else within the CNS.

HGG is a rare, fast-growing CNS tumor that forms in glial cells of the brain and spinal cord; can be found almost anywhere within the CNS, but are most commonly within the supratentorium in children ages 15–19; HGG found in children are different from those in adults.

Other research and applications
In the ongoing and planned ReSPECT™ Clinical Trials, the safety & effectiveness of an investigational therapy, Rhenium-186 NanoLiposome (186RNL), will be evaluated in patients with central nervous system (CNS) tumors.

Rhenium NanoLiposome has been evaluated in preclinical studies for breast cancer, ovarian cancer, and head/neck cancer.

References

External links
 

Companies based in Austin, Texas
Companies listed on the Nasdaq